Vespinitocris dux is a species of beetle in the family Cerambycidae. It was described by Karl Jordan in 1894. It is known from the Democratic Republic of the Congo and Gabon.

References

Saperdini
Beetles described in 1894